L'Union des écrivaines et des écrivains québécois (UNEQ; English: Québec Union of Writers) is a professional union of writers in Québec, Canada.

Founded on March 21, 1977 by some 50 writers following the leadership of Jacques Godbout, it represents today some 1,200 writers (poets, novelists, drama authors, essayists, authors of scientific and practical works). Its stated mission is to promote Québec literature and defend the social and economic rights of persons of the literary profession.

Board of directors

 Stanley Péan, president
 Danièle Simpson, vice-president
 Sylvain Campeau, secretary-treasurer
 Sylvain Meunier, administrator
 François Jobin, administrator
 Nadia Ghalem, administrator
 Renaud Longchamps, administrator and representative of regions outside Montreal

See also

 Quebec literature
 List of Quebec writers

External links
 Web site (French only)
 List of members

Canadian writers' organizations
Professional associations based in Quebec
Culture of Quebec
French-language literature in Canada
Trade unions in Quebec
Trade unions established in 1977